The 1973 Maureen Connolly Brinker International was a women's tennis tournament played on indoor hardcourts at the Brookhaven Country Club in Dallas, Texas that was part of the 1973 USLTA Women's Circuit. It was the second edition of the tournament, held from March 5 through March 11, 1973. Third-seeded Virginia Wade won the singles title and earned $12,000 first-prize money.

Finals

Singles
 Virginia Wade defeated  Evonne Goolagong 6–4, 6–1

Doubles
 Evonne Goolagong /  Janet Young defeated  Gail Sherriff /  Virginia Wade 6–3, 6–2

Prize money

References

Maureen Connolly Brinker International
Virginia Slims of Dallas
Maureen Connolly Brinker International
Maureen Connolly Brinker International
Maureen Connolly Brinker International
Maureen Connolly Brinker International